The 1980–81 Idaho Vandals men's basketball team represented the University of Idaho during the 1980–81 NCAA Division I men's basketball season. The Vandals were led by third-year head coach Don Monson and played their home games on campus at the Kibbie Dome in Moscow, Idaho.

Idaho won its first eleven games (including road wins at Nebraska, Washington State, and Gonzaga), went  in the regular season, and won the Big Sky Conference regular season championship, their first conference title in 58 years.

Polls
Idaho was ranked for the first time in school history in February, for three weeks in the  UPI coaches poll.  Curiously, they entered its top twenty after a road  rose  then exited after completing the regular season with a nine-point road win. The Vandals received votes, but did not appear, in the AP writers poll (top twenty) until January 1982; they were ranked sixth in both polls at end of that regular  and eighth in both final polls.

Attendance
Prior to this season, the school attendance record for basketball was 6,449, set five years earlier at the Kibbie Dome's inaugural hoop game in January 1976 against Palouse neighbor Washington State. That was surpassed in 1981 with 6,800 for the conference opener with Weber State on Thursday, January 8.
 
The final two home regular season games both saw new records, as title-contending Montana State and Montana visited: 7,100 on Thursday,  which was shattered with 9,000 two days later for Idaho's nineteenth consecutive home  (Two years later, the record increased to 11,800.)

All-conference
Sophomore guard Brian Kellerman was the Big Sky's player of the year and a first team all-conference selection. Vandals on the second team were sophomore forward Phil Hopson, senior center Ron Maben, and junior point guard Ken Owens, the MVP of the conference tournament.

Notes
Center Jeff Brudie earned a degree in civil engineering, graduated from the UI law school, and is a district judge in Lewiston.

Roster

Schedule and results

|-
!colspan=9 style=| Big Sky tournament

|-
!colspan=9 style=| NCAA Tournament

References

External links
Sports Reference – Idaho Vandals: 1980–81 basketball season
Gem of the Mountains: 1981 University of Idaho yearbook – 1980–81 basketball season
Idaho Argonaut – student newspaper – 1981 editions
Team photo – 1980–81 Idaho Vandals

Idaho Vandals men's basketball seasons
Idaho
Idaho
Idaho
Idaho